Zemelanopsis trifasciata is a species of freshwater snail in the family Melanopsidae. It is endemic to New Zealand, where it is found in fresh and brackish water habitat throughout the country.

The type locality is "Waitanga Falls", in Waitangi, Northland, Bay of Islands, New Zealand.

Description
The width of the shell is 11–17 mm. The height of the shell is 18–30 mm.

Ecology
It lives in streams and rivers near their estuaries.

References

Further reading
 Bedford J. J. (1972). "Osmoregulation in Melanopsis trifasciata II. The osmotic pressure and the principal ions of the hemocoelic fluid". Physiological zoology 45(3): 261-269.
 Bilgin F. H. (1973). "Studies on the functional anatomy of Melanopsis praemorsa (L.) and Zemelanopsis trifasciata (Gray)". Proceedings Malacological Society of London 40: 379.
 Powell A. W. B., New Zealand Mollusca, William Collins Publishers Ltd, Auckland, New Zealand 1979 
 Smith E. A. (1844). Mollusca. page 3, plate 1, fig. 22, 18. In: Richardson J. & Gray J. E. (eds.) The zoology of the voyage of the H.M.S. Erebus & Terror, under the command of Captain Sir James Clark Ross, during the years 1839 to 1843. London.
 Suter H. (1915). Manual of the New Zealand Mollusca. Atlas of plates. John Mackay, Government printer, Wellington. plate 39, figure 11.
 Winterbourn M. J. (1973). A guide to the freshwater mollusca of New Zealand. Tuatara 20(3) 142.

External links

Gastropods of New Zealand
Melanopsidae
Gastropods described in 1843
Taxa named by John Edward Gray